The 2024 United States presidential election in New York is scheduled to take place on Tuesday, November 5, 2024, as part of the 2024 United States elections in which all 50 states plus the District of Columbia will participate. New York voters will choose electors to represent them in the Electoral College via a popular vote. The state of New York has 28 electoral votes in the Electoral College, following reapportionment due to the 2020 United States census in which the state lost a seat.

Incumbent Democratic president Joe Biden has stated that he intends to run for reelection to a second term.

Primary elections

Republican primary

The New York Republican primary is scheduled to be held on April 30, 2024, alongside the Connecticut primary.

General election

Polling

Joe Biden vs. Donald Trump

See also 
 United States presidential elections in New York
 2024 United States presidential election
 2024 Democratic Party presidential primaries
 2024 Republican Party presidential primaries
 2024 United States elections

Notes

Partisan clients

References 

New York (state)
2024
Presidential